Dafni ( meaning "laurel", before 1955: Δαριμάρι - Darimari) is a small village in Boeotia, Greece. It is part of the municipal unit Dervenochoria. In 2011 its population was 101. Dafni is situated on the northern edge of Pastra mountain. It is in a sparsely populated agricultural area, with forests to the south. Dafni lies 7 km northwest of Pyli, 9 km east of Erythres and 13 km southeast of Thiva.

Population

See also
List of settlements in Boeotia

References

External links
 Dafni on GTP Travel Pages

Dervenochoria
Populated places in Boeotia